Qarah Tappeh (also Romanized as Qareh Tappeh) is a village in Ab Barik Rural District, in the Central District of Sonqor County, Kermanshah Province, Iran. At the 2006 census, its population was 420, in 128 families.

References 

Populated places in Sonqor County